Gaude Mater Polonia (Medieval Latin for "Rejoice, oh Mother Poland"; , Polish: Raduj się, matko Polsko) was one of the most significant medieval Polish hymns, written in Latin between the 13th and the 14th century to commemorate Saint Stanislaus, Bishop of Kraków. Polish knights sang and chanted the hymn after victory in battle, presumably to one of the Gregorian melodies associated with the Eucharistic psalm O Salutaris Hostia on which it is based. It's widely considered a historical, national anthem of the Kingdom of Poland and the Polish–Lithuanian Commonwealth.

History
The anthem came to existence in 1253, along with the canonization of Stanislaus of Szczepanów on 8 September in Assisi; Stanislaus died a martyr's death on 11 April 1079. The author of the anthem is the first Polish composer in music history known by name, the poet Vincent of Kielcz, OP, a Cracovian canon and chaplain of Bishop Iwo Odrowąż. For a long time he was mistakenly called Vincent of Kielce, and he wrote the hymn to commemorate the canonization of Saint Stanislaus. It is assumed that the first performance of the piece took place on 8 May 1254, during the canonization ceremonies in Kraków.

Vincent wrote The History of St. Stanislas in Latin (Dies adest celebris). The poet decided to describe the life and accomplishments of Bishop Stanislaus and the miracles which occurred after his death, which people had been speaking of for almost two centuries. The legend says that after the body of St. Stanislaus was dismembered, the parts miraculously regrouped and formed the whole body again, while eagles circled in the sky. This was an allegory of the current state of Poland in those years: split into pieces but hoping to grow back together to form a country again. The uniting of Poland occurred a couple years after the canonization of St. Stanislaus under the rule of King Ladislaus the Short.

Within the History, which contained sung elements, the part Gaude, Mater Polonia was after a time recognised as an independent piece. Throughout the years, it eventually became the royal anthem under the Piast Dynasty. The anthem became a part of Polish tradition and history, being sung during the coronation of the Polish monarch, royal marriages, as well as during celebrations of the 1683 victory of John III Sobieski in Vienna. Kings and military commanders gave thanks for their successes by singing the anthem after battle. The melody has been popular for almost 750 years, in which it has since become a key element of Polish culture. Today it is sung at most universities for the inauguration of the academic year as well as during important national holidays.

Music
From a musical view, Gaude, Mater Polonia holds a unique melodic line that does not resemble any known in other Latin anthems. Its melody has a symmetrical structure, of an arc or bow type, making it a story-type melody that is characteristic of folk songs. It has an overjoyed but proud character. Some sources say that the inspiration for the melody was the anthem to Saint Dominic, Gaude Mater Ecclesia ("Rejoice, oh Mother Church"), having its roots with Italian Dominicans.

It is most commonly sung in the arrangement of Teofil Tomasz Klonowski (1805–1876). It is written for a four-voice, mixed choir, with the melody being captured in a four measure phrase. Although it is no longer the National anthem of Poland, it often accompanies ceremonies of national and religious importance.

Lyrics
Gaude Mater Polonia
O ciesz się, Matko-Polsko

See also
 Bogurodzica
 Mazurek Dąbrowskiego
 Polish music
 Szlachta

References

European anthems
National symbols of Poland
Historical national anthems
Polish nobility
Polish songs
Polish patriotic songs
The Most Holy Virgin Mary, Queen of Poland